Tui Ātua Tupua Tamasese Lealofi IV (8 May 1922 – 9 July 1983) was the second prime minister of Samoa from 25 February 1970 to 20 March 1973 and again from 21 May 1975 to 24 March 1976. He held the title of Tupua Tamasese, one of the four main chiefly titles of Samoa (the Tama-a-Aiga) from 1965 until his death in 1983.

Biography
Lealofi was born in Apia in May 1922, the eldest son of Mau movement leader Tupua Tamasese Lealofi III, who was killed by New Zealand Police in 1929. After studying at the Marist Brothers school and Malifa high school, he attended the Fiji School of Medicine between 1940 and 1945, qualifying as a medical practitioner. He then worked as a doctor for the Health Department. In 1965 he became Tupua Tamasese following the death of his uncle Tupua Tamasese Meaʻole. This entitled him to become a member of the Council of Deputies, to which he was elected in 1968.

In 1970 he resigned from the Council of Deputies to contest elections to the Legislative Assembly, and was elected in the Anoamaa East constituency. Following the elections, he was elected Prime Minister, defeating incumbent Fiame Mata'afa in the third round of voting. However, following the 1973 elections he was eliminated in the first round of voting for Prime Minister, and was succeeded by Mata'afa. Mata'afa subsequently appointed him as Minister of Justice.

Mata'afa died in 1975 and Lealofi was appointed by then Head of State, Malietoa Tanumafili II, as his replacement. Following the 1976 elections he was defeated in the vote for Prime Minister by his cousin, Tupuola Efi. He subsequently resigned from the Legislative Assembly and was elected to the Council of Deputies again.

Lealofi died in Matautu on Upolu Island in July 1983 at the age of 61.

References

1922 births
People from Apia
Fiji School of Medicine alumni
Samoan physicians
Samoan chiefs
Members of the Legislative Assembly of Samoa
Prime Ministers of Samoa
Government ministers of Samoa
Members of the Council of Deputies
1983 deaths
20th-century physicians